Gol Tappeh (also known as Gul Tepe) is a village in Bughda Kandi Rural District, in the Central District of Zanjan County, Zanjan Province, Iran. At the 2006 census, its population was 857, in 191 families.

References 

Populated places in Zanjan County